Tantite is a rare tantalum oxide mineral with formula: Ta2O5. Tantite forms transparent microscopic colorless triclinic - pedial crystals with an adamantine luster. It has a Mohs hardness of 7 and a high specific gravity of 8.45. Chemical analyses show minor inclusion (1.3%) of niobium oxide.

It was first described in 1983 for an occurrence in a pegmatite in the Kola peninsula, Russia. It has also been reported from a pegmatite complex in Florence County, Wisconsin. Associated mineral species include elbaite, lepidolite, spodumene, columbite-tantalite, wodginite, and microlite.

References

Wisconsin minerals Accessed March 31, 2006. 
American Mineralogist data sheet PDF  Accessed March 31, 2006.

Tantalum minerals
Oxide minerals
Triclinic minerals
Minerals in space group 1
Minerals described in 1983